The following article presents a summary of the 1928 football (soccer) season in Brazil, which was the 27th season of competitive football in the country.

Campeonato Paulista

In 1928 there were two different editions of the Campeonato Paulista. One was organized by the Associação Paulista de Esportes Atléticos (APEA) while the other one was organized by the Liga de Amadores de Futebol (LAF).

APEA's Campeonato Paulista

Final Standings

Comercial-RP matches were canceled, as the club abandoned the competition.

Corinthians declared as the APEA's Campeonato Paulista champions.

LAF's Campeonato Paulista

Final Standings

SC Internacional de São Paulo declared as the LAF's Campeonato Paulista champions.

State championship champions

Other competition champions

Brazil national team
The following table lists all the games played by the Brazil national football team in official competitions and friendly matches during 1928.

References

 Brazilian competitions at RSSSF
 1928 Brazil national team matches at RSSSF

 
Seasons in Brazilian football
Brazil